Digimortal may refer to:

 Digimortal (album), a 2001 album by Fear Factory
 Digimortal (manga), a 2004 manga by Tsutomu Nihei